This article contains information about the literary events and publications of 1781.

Events
March 27 – George Crabbe writes to Edmund Burke, enclosing examples of his work. The outcome is the publication of Crabbe's poem The Library.
August 5 – Antonín Strnad completes an inventory of the contents of the Clementinum in Prague, which becomes a national library.
unknown date – Rudolf Erich Raspe (anonymously) publishes "M-h-s-nsche Geschichten" ("M-h-s-n Stories") in the Berlin humor magazine Vade mecum für lustige Leute ("Handbook for Fun-loving People"), the first appearance of Baron Munchausen in fiction.

New books

Fiction
Robert Bage – Mount Henneth
Christoph Friedrich Bretzner – Belmont und Constanze
William Combe – Letters of an Italian Nun and an English Gentleman
Eugenio Espejo – La ciencia blancardina 
Benjamin Franklin – A Letter To A Royal Academy
Charles Johnstone – The History of John Juniper
Henry Mackenzie – Julia de Roubignei
Glocester Ridley – Melanpus
Anna Seward – Monody on Major André

Children
Mrs. Barbauld – Hymns in Prose for Children
Joachim Heinrich Campe – Die Entdeckung von Amerika (Discovery of America)

Drama
Miles Peter Andrews – Dissipation
Frances Brooke – The Siege of Sinope
Hannah Cowley – The World as it Goes
Elizabeth Craven – The Miniature Picture
John Delap – The Royal Suppliants
Johann Wolfgang von Goethe – Iphigenia in Tauris (revised version)
Thomas Holcroft – Duplicity
Elizabeth Inchbald – Polygamy
Robert Jephson – The Count of Narbonne
John O'Keeffe – The Agreeable Surprise
Samuel Jackson Pratt – The Fair Circassian
Friedrich Schiller – The Robbers (Die Räuber, published)
Richard Brinsley Sheridan
The Critic (published)
A Trip to Scarborough

Poetry

William Cowper – Anti-Thelyphthora
George Crabbe – The Library
Maria De Fleury – Poems, Occasioned by the Confinement and Acquittal of the Right Honourable Lord George Gordon, President of the Protestant Association
Santa Rita Durão – Caramuru
Anne Francis – A Poetical Translation of the Song of Solomon
Philip Freneau – The British Prison-Ship
William Hayley – The Triumphs of Temper
George Keate – Works
Samuel Jackson Pratt – Sympathy

Non-fiction
Maria De Fleury – Unrighteous Abuse Detected and Chastised
Mary Deverell – Sermons on the Following Subjects...
Edward Gibbon – Volumes II and III of The History of the Decline and Fall of the Roman Empire
Henry Home – Loose Hints Upon Education
Samuel Johnson
The Beauties of Johnson
Lives of the Most Eminent English Poets
Immanuel Kant – Critique of Pure Reason
John Moore – A View of Society and Manners in Italy
John Newton – Cardiphonia
John Nichols – Biographical Anecdotes of William Hogarth
Magister Pianco (Hans Heinrich von Ecker und Eckhoffen) – Der Rosenkreutzer in seiner Blösse
Jean-Jacques Rousseau – Essai sur l'origine des langues

Births
January 26 – Ludwig Achim von Arnim, German poet and novelist (died 1831)
January 30 – Adelbert von Chamisso, German poet and botanist (died 1838)
February 26 – Peter Andresen Oelrichs, Heligoland-born lexicographer (died 1869)
March 17 – Ebenezer Elliott, English poet (died 1849)
May 14 – Friedrich Ludwig Georg von Raumer, German historian (died 1873)
June 12 (probable) – Christian Isobel Johnstone, Scottish journalist and novelist (died 1857)
November 3 – Sarah Elizabeth Utterson, English translator and short story writer (died 1851)
November 6 – Lucy Aikin (Mary Godolphin), English historical writer (died 1864)
November 29 – Andrés Bello, Venezuelan polymath (died 1865)  
December 6 – Charlotte von Ahlefeld, German novelist (died 1849)
December 11 – David Brewster, Scottish scientist and writer (died 1868)

Deaths
February 15 – Gotthold Ephraim Lessing, German philosopher and dramatist (born 1729)
February 22 – Anna Magdalena Godiche, Danish book printer and publisher (born 1721) 
February 24 – Edward Capell, English Shakespeare scholar (born 1713)
March 1 – Jean-Baptiste de La Curne de Sainte-Palaye, French historian, classicist and lexicographer (born 1697)
March 17 – Johannes Ewald, Danish dramatist and poet (born 1743)
May 8 – Richard Jago, English poet and cleric (born 1715)
June 24 – Anna Miller, English poet and salon hostess (born 1741)
 September 11 – Johann August Ernesti, German theologian and philologist (born 1707)
November 2 – José Francisco de Isla, Spanish satirist (born 1703)
November 4 – Johann Nikolaus Götz, German poet (born 1721)
December 7 – Judith Madan, English poet (born 1702)

References

 
Years of the 18th century in literature